Malek is a surname. Notable people with the name include:

 Ahmed Malek (1931–2008), Algerian artist, music film composer and conductor
 Alia Malek (born 1974), American journalist and lawyer
 Amy Malek (c. 1979/1980), American scholar, and sociocultural anthropologist
 Fred Malek (born 1936), American business executive, political advisor, and philanthropist
 George Malek-Yonan (1924–2014), Iranian Assyrian international attorney, politician, and athlete
 Leona Alford Malek (1878–1953), American home economist, editor, and writer
 Milton Malek-Yonan (1904–2002), Iranian Assyrian entrepreneur and inventor.
 Miklós Malek (composer) (born 1945), Hungarian classical composer, arranger, and musician 
 Miklós Malek (musician), aka Miklós Malek Jr., (born 1975), Hungarian pop music songwriter, producer, artist, and television personality, son of composer Miklós Malek above
 Rami Malek (born 1981), American actor of Egyptian descent
 Roman Málek (born 1977), Czech ice hockey player
 Rosie Malek-Yonan (born 1965), Assyrian-American actress, author, director, public figure, and activist
 Yusuf Malek, Iranian-Iraqi Assyrian politician

See also
Malek (given name)

Arabic-language surnames